The Ecclesiastical Courts Jurisdiction Act 1860 (ECJA; 23 & 24 Vict c 32) is an Act of the Parliament of the United Kingdom. It is one of the Ecclesiastical Courts Acts 1787 to 1860.

Section 1
Section 1 provided that it was not lawful for an ecclesiastical court in England or Ireland to entertain or adjudicate on a suit or cause of brawling or defamation against any person not in holy orders.

Where a person had been committed to gaol under a writ , that person was to be discharged.

This section was repealed by section 87 of, and Schedule 5 to, the Ecclesiastical Jurisdiction Measure 1963.

Section 5
This section repealed the Brawling Act 1551. This section was repealed by the Statute Law Revision Act 1875.

Section 6
This section provided that nothing contained hereinbefore in this Act was to be taken to repeal or alter the Brawling Act 1553, the Act of Uniformity 1558 or section 18 of the Toleration Act 1688. This section was repealed by section 1 of, and Part II of the Schedule to, the Statute Law (Repeals) Act 1969.

Developments

In 1998, political campaigner Peter Tatchell was charged under Section 2 of the Act for "indecent behaviour in a church".

In 2002, the House of Lords' Select Committee on Religious Offences in England and Wales delivered their First Report. In Chapter 3 of this report, they examined the "Law as it stands", including looking at "Old statutes". This included the Ecclesiastical Courts Jurisdiction Act 1860, where they revealed that "According to statistics made available by the Home Office, there were 60 prosecutions under this Act in the six years 1997–2002, with 21 convictions." In his evidence to the Committee, David Calvert-Smith, the Director of Public Prosecutions said that: "We use it sufficiently often or have used it in the past for it obviously to be the right offence to use and a redrafted Section 2 would probably be a (albeit infrequently used) valuable offence."

In a landmark decision in 2017, a new law was enacted, nicknamed "Turing's Law", which will allow posthumous pardons for anyone convicted under former law, including, but not exclusively the Ecclesiastical Courts Jurisdiction Act 1860, the 1956 and 1967 Sexual Offences Acts, both of which yet remain to be overturned. Under the new law, descendants, relatives, and advocates can now apply to have the records of dead gay and bisexual men cleared in the law. Several restrictions, as yet, remain in place. The restrictions mean that pardons might not be granted in more complicated cases like that of Oscar Wilde, who was convicted of gross indecency with evidence that he frequented prostitutes. Justice minister Sam Gyimah, who advocated for the legislation, said, "This is a truly momentous day. We can never undo the hurt caused, but we have apologised and taken action to right these wrongs. I am immensely proud that 'Turing’s law' has become a reality under this government." Human rights advocate Peter Tatchell estimated that between 50,000 and 100,000 men who were convicted under various anti-gay laws in the UK may be eligible for pardons. Tatchell noted that some laws are not specifically mentioned as being up for pardon. "It does not explicitly allow for the pardoning of men convicted of soliciting and procuring homosexual relations under the 1956 and 1967 Sexual Offences Acts. Nor does it pardon those people, including some lesbians, convicted for same-sex kissing and cuddling under laws such as the Public Order Act 1986, the common law offence of outraging public decency, the Town Police Clauses Act 1847, the Ecclesiastical Courts Jurisdiction Act 1860 and the army, navy and air force acts and other diverse statutes."

The law only applies to cases where the offenses would not be considered crimes today. The law was modeled on the Queen's 2013 posthumous pardon of Alan Turing, who helped decode encrypted messages sent by Nazi Germany in World War II but was convicted of gross indecency after the war.

References
Halsbury's Statutes,

External links
The Ecclesiastical Courts Jurisdiction Act 1860, as amended, from Legislation.gov.uk.
The Ecclesiastical Courts Jurisdiction Act 1860, as originally enacted, from Legislation.gov.uk.

United Kingdom Acts of Parliament 1860
1860 in religion